Camilla Gunell (born 7 September 1970) is a politician within the Åland Islands, an autonomous and unilingually Swedish territory of Finland, and the former Premier of the Government of Åland.

Positions

Current

Past
Member of the lagting (The Parliament of Åland) 2007–2011
Minister of Education and Culture 2005–2007
Member of the lagting (The Parliament of Åland) 2003–2005
 Government of Åland Premier of Åland Islands from 2011 to 2015

References

1970 births
Living people
Women government ministers of Åland
Finnish Lutherans
Women heads of government of non-sovereign entities
21st-century Finnish women politicians
Premiers of Åland